Plasmodium basilisci is a parasite of the genus Plasmodium subgenus Carinamoeba.

Like all Plasmodium species P. basilisci has both vertebrate and insect hosts. The vertebrate hosts for this parasite are reptiles.

Discovery and description 

The first description of Plasmodium basilisci was in 2 iguanids of the sp. Basiliscus family (Wiegman, 1828)

According to Palaez and Perez-Reyes:

According to Nancy L. Herban and G. Robert Coatney, the following observation was made by Donald J. Pletsch on two Iguana iguana rhinolpha on April 28, 1968 in San Salvador:

Today, it is known to be infecting reptiles only.

Distribution 

This species occurs in Brazil, El Salvador and Honduras:

Notes

 Cyril Garnham found that a P. tropiduri parasite discovered by Fonseca to be P. basilisci but with eight merozoites per schizont.: Brazil, 1952.
 Garnham described P. basilisci in the British Honduras in 1963.
 Perez-Reyez found P. basilisci Pelaez, Mexican P. basilisci, in the blood of two Iguana iguana in El Salvador, Honduras in 1959. This type of P. basilisci was slightly larger and differed in the number of merozoites. According to Graham it functioned by paraziting proerythrocytes containing more merozoites than those in erythrocytes with its schizonts.
 Gorgas Memorial Laboratory scientists detected Plasmodium basilisci in Basiliscus vittatus and Basiliscus plumbifrons: Panama, 1964.

Hosts 

This species infects the striped basilisk (Basiliscus vittatus), Basiliscus plumbifrons and Iguana iguana rhinolopha.

References 

basilisci